Kennisis Lake/Francis Water Aerodrome  is an aerodrome located on Kennisis Lake,  north northwest of West Guilford, Ontario, Canada.

References

Registered aerodromes in Ontario
Seaplane bases in Ontario
Buildings and structures in Haliburton County